The 1926 Loyola Lions football team was an American football team that represented Loyola College of Los Angeles (now known as Loyola Marymount University) as an independent during the 1926 college football season. In their fourth season under head coach William L. Driver, the Lions compiled a 6–0–2 record.

Schedule

References

Loyola
Loyola Lions football seasons
College football undefeated seasons
Loyola Lions football